Houff is a surname. Notable people with the surname include:

 Florens van der Houff (1600–1657), Dutch magistrate and mayor
 Quin Houff (born 1997), American stock car racing driver

See also
 Hoff (surname)
 Huff (surname)